Phrictus quinquepartitus, also known as the wart-headed bug and the dragon-headed bug, is an insect belonging to the family Fulgoridae. They were described by English entomologist William Lucas Distant in 1883. They are found in Costa Rica, Panama, Colombia, and parts of Brazil.

P. quinquepartitus averages  in length. They have brightly colored hind wings and forewings with distinctive markings. Their source of nourishment is tree sap, which they ingest using a tube-like organ in place of a mouth.

The species name is occasionally seen spelled Phrictus quinqueparitus.

References

External links
 
 
 
 
 

Insects of Central America
Fulgorinae
Insects described in 1883